Aime Rebecca Motter Awl (née Aime Rebecca Motter;  – ), also known more commonly as Aime M. Awl, was an American scientific illustrator who worked for the U.S. Department of Agriculture, and the U.S. National Museum (now the National Museum of Natural History). Awl is internationally recognized for her scientific illustration, especially of fish species.

Biography 
Aime Rebecca Motter was born in Frederick, Maryland on January 15, to Effie Buhrman (née Market) and Judge John Columbus Motter. She graduated from the Girls' High School of Frederick. Awl married Major Francis Asbury Awl, Jr., on May 22, 1922 in West Virginia and they had no children. Awl attended classes at the Department of Art as Applied to Medicine at the Johns Hopkins School of Medicine, where she was a student of Max Brödel.

Awl worked as a scientific delineator for the Smithsonian Institute and her work appeared in a wide range of scientific publications and the Encyclopædia Britannica. She drew fish species, such as Daniops Myersi.

Awl died on October 15, 1973, at the Vindobona Nursing Home in Braddock Heights, Maryland.

References 

Created via preloaddraft
Scientific illustrators
1887 births
1973 deaths
People from Frederick, Maryland
United States Department of Agriculture people
Johns Hopkins School of Medicine alumni
American women illustrators
Artists from Maryland
20th-century American artists
20th-century American women artists
Smithsonian Institution people